Adriana Ángeles Lozada (born 19 January 1979) is a Mexican judoka. She competed in the women's extra-lightweight event at the 2000 Summer Olympics.

References

External links
 

1979 births
Living people
Mexican female judoka
Olympic judoka of Mexico
Judoka at the 2000 Summer Olympics
People from Pachuca
Pan American Games medalists in judo
Pan American Games bronze medalists for Mexico
Judoka at the 1999 Pan American Games
Medalists at the 1999 Pan American Games
21st-century Mexican women